The Italian general election of 2008 took place on 13 April 2008 – 14 April 2008. The election was won in Piedmont by the centre-right coalition between The People of Freedom and Lega Nord, as it happened at the national level. The People of Freedom was the largest party in the election with 34.3%, ahead of the Democratic Party (32.4%) and Lega Nord (12.6%).

Results

Chamber of Deputies

|-
|- style="background-color:#E9E9E9"
! rowspan="1" style="text-align:left;vertical-align:top;" |Coalition leader
! rowspan="1" style="text-align:center;vertical-align:top;" |votes
! rowspan="1" style="text-align:center;vertical-align:top;" |votes (%)
! rowspan="1" style="text-align:center;vertical-align:top;" |seats
! rowspan="1" style="text-align:left;vertical-align:top;" |Party
! rowspan="1" style="text-align:center;vertical-align:top;" |votes
! rowspan="1" style="text-align:center;vertical-align:top;" |votes (%)
! rowspan="1" style="text-align:center;vertical-align:top;" |seats
|-
! rowspan="2" style="text-align:left;vertical-align:top;" |Silvio Berlusconi
| rowspan="2" style="vertical-align:top;" |1,278,830
| rowspan="2" style="vertical-align:top;" |46.8
| rowspan="2" style="vertical-align:top;" |27

| style="text-align:left;" |The People of Freedom
| style="vertical-align:top;" |935,890
| style="vertical-align:top;" |34.3
| style="vertical-align:top;" |19
|-
| style="text-align:left;" |Lega Nord
| style="vertical-align:top;" |342,940
| style="vertical-align:top;" |12.6
| style="vertical-align:top;" |8

|-
! rowspan="2" style="text-align:left;vertical-align:top;" |Walter Veltroni
| rowspan="2" style="vertical-align:top;" |1,021,623
| rowspan="2" style="vertical-align:top;" |37.4
| rowspan="2" style="vertical-align:top;" |18

| style="text-align:left;" |Democratic Party
| style="vertical-align:top;" |885,549
| style="vertical-align:top;" |32.4
| style="vertical-align:top;" |15
|-
| style="text-align:left;" |Italy of Values
| style="vertical-align:top;" |136,074
| style="vertical-align:top;" |5.0
| style="vertical-align:top;" |3

|-
! rowspan="1" style="text-align:left;vertical-align:top;" |Pier Ferdinando Casini
| rowspan="1" style="vertical-align:top;" |141,335
| rowspan="1" style="vertical-align:top;" |5.2
| rowspan="1" style="vertical-align:top;" |2

| style="text-align:left;" |Union of the Centre
| style="vertical-align:top;" |143,335
| style="vertical-align:top;" |5.2
| style="vertical-align:top;" |2

|-
! rowspan="1" style="text-align:left;vertical-align:top;" |Fausto Bertinotti
| rowspan="1" style="vertical-align:top;" |92,699
| rowspan="1" style="vertical-align:top;" |3.4
| rowspan="1" style="vertical-align:top;" |-

| style="text-align:left;" |The Left – The Rainbow
| style="vertical-align:top;" |92,699
| style="vertical-align:top;" |3.4
| style="vertical-align:top;" |-

|-
! rowspan="1" style="text-align:left;vertical-align:top;" |Daniela Santanchè
| rowspan="1" style="vertical-align:top;" |86,885
| rowspan="1" style="vertical-align:top;" |3.2
| rowspan="1" style="vertical-align:top;" |-

| style="text-align:left;" |The Right
| style="vertical-align:top;" |86,885
| style="vertical-align:top;" |3.2
| style="vertical-align:top;" |-

|-
! rowspan="1" style="text-align:left;vertical-align:top;" |Marco Ferrando
| rowspan="1" style="vertical-align:top;" |18,491
| rowspan="1" style="vertical-align:top;" |0.7
| rowspan="1" style="vertical-align:top;" |-

| style="text-align:left;" |Workers' Communist Party
| style="vertical-align:top;" |18,491
| style="vertical-align:top;" |0.7
| style="vertical-align:top;" |-

|-
! rowspan="1" style="text-align:left;vertical-align:top;" |Enrico Boselli
| rowspan="1" style="vertical-align:top;" |18,101
| rowspan="1" style="vertical-align:top;" |0.7
| rowspan="1" style="vertical-align:top;" |-

| style="text-align:left;" |Socialist Party
| style="vertical-align:top;" |18,101
| style="vertical-align:top;" |0.7
| style="vertical-align:top;" |-

|-
! rowspan="1" style="text-align:left;vertical-align:top;" |Flavia D'Angeli
| rowspan="1" style="vertical-align:top;" |14,989
| rowspan="1" style="vertical-align:top;" |0.5
| rowspan="1" style="vertical-align:top;" |-

| style="text-align:left;" |Critical Left
| style="vertical-align:top;" |14,989
| style="vertical-align:top;" |0.5
| style="vertical-align:top;" |-

|-
! rowspan="1" style="text-align:left;vertical-align:top;" |Others
| rowspan="1" style="vertical-align:top;" |45,334
| rowspan="1" style="vertical-align:top;" |1.9
| rowspan="1" style="vertical-align:top;" |-

| style="text-align:left;" |others
| style="vertical-align:top;" |45,334
| style="vertical-align:top;" |1.9
| style="vertical-align:top;" |-

|-
|- style="background-color:#E9E9E9"
! rowspan="1" style="text-align:left;vertical-align:top;" |Total coalitions
! rowspan="1" style="text-align:right;vertical-align:top;" |2,730,221
! rowspan="1" style="text-align:right;vertical-align:top;" |100.0
! rowspan="1" style="text-align:right;vertical-align:top;" |47
! rowspan="1" style="text-align:left;vertical-align:top;" |Total parties
! rowspan="1" style="text-align:right;vertical-align:top;" |2,730,221
! rowspan="1" style="text-align:right;vertical-align:top;" |100.0
! rowspan="1" style="text-align:right;vertical-align:top;" |47

Source: Ministry of the Interior

Senate

|-
|- style="background-color:#E9E9E9"
! rowspan="1" style="text-align:left;vertical-align:top;" |Coalition leader
! rowspan="1" style="text-align:center;vertical-align:top;" |votes
! rowspan="1" style="text-align:center;vertical-align:top;" |votes (%)
! rowspan="1" style="text-align:center;vertical-align:top;" |seats
! rowspan="1" style="text-align:left;vertical-align:top;" |Party
! rowspan="1" style="text-align:center;vertical-align:top;" |votes
! rowspan="1" style="text-align:center;vertical-align:top;" |votes (%)
! rowspan="1" style="text-align:center;vertical-align:top;" |seats
|-
! rowspan="2" style="text-align:left;vertical-align:top;" |Silvio Berlusconi
| rowspan="2" style="vertical-align:top;" |1,204,737
| rowspan="2" style="vertical-align:top;" |47.5
| rowspan="2" style="vertical-align:top;" |13

| style="text-align:left;" |The People of Freedom
| style="vertical-align:top;" |892,479
| style="vertical-align:top;" |35.2
| style="vertical-align:top;" |10
|-
| style="text-align:left;" |Lega Nord
| style="vertical-align:top;" |312,258
| style="vertical-align:top;" |12.3
| style="vertical-align:top;" |3

|-
! rowspan="2" style="text-align:left;vertical-align:top;" |Walter Veltroni
| rowspan="2" style="vertical-align:top;" |967,805
| rowspan="2" style="vertical-align:top;" |38.2
| rowspan="2" style="vertical-align:top;" |9

| style="text-align:left;" |Democratic Party
| style="vertical-align:top;" |841,666
| style="vertical-align:top;" |33.2
| style="vertical-align:top;" |8
|-
| style="text-align:left;" |Italy of Values
| style="vertical-align:top;" |126,139
| style="vertical-align:top;" |5.0
| style="vertical-align:top;" |1

|-
! rowspan="1" style="text-align:left;vertical-align:top;" |Pier Ferdinando Casini
| rowspan="1" style="vertical-align:top;" |134,221
| rowspan="1" style="vertical-align:top;" |5.3
| rowspan="1" style="vertical-align:top;" |-

| style="text-align:left;" |Union of the Centre
| style="vertical-align:top;" |134,221
| style="vertical-align:top;" |5.3
| style="vertical-align:top;" |-

|-
! rowspan="1" style="text-align:left;vertical-align:top;" |Fausto Bertinotti
| rowspan="1" style="vertical-align:top;" |84,235
| rowspan="1" style="vertical-align:top;" |3.3
| rowspan="1" style="vertical-align:top;" |-

| style="text-align:left;" |The Left – The Rainbow
| style="vertical-align:top;" |84,235
| style="vertical-align:top;" |3.3
| style="vertical-align:top;" |-

|-
! rowspan="1" style="text-align:left;vertical-align:top;" |Daniela Santanchè
| rowspan="1" style="vertical-align:top;" |68,742
| rowspan="1" style="vertical-align:top;" |2.7
| rowspan="1" style="vertical-align:top;" |-

| style="text-align:left;" |The Right
| style="vertical-align:top;" |68,742
| style="vertical-align:top;" |2.7
| style="vertical-align:top;" |-

|-
! rowspan="1" style="text-align:left;vertical-align:top;" |Marco Ferrando
| rowspan="1" style="vertical-align:top;" |16,184
| rowspan="1" style="vertical-align:top;" |0.6
| rowspan="1" style="vertical-align:top;" |-

| style="text-align:left;" |Workers' Communist Party
| style="vertical-align:top;" |16,184
| style="vertical-align:top;" |0.6
| style="vertical-align:top;" |-

|-
! rowspan="1" style="text-align:left;vertical-align:top;" |Enrico Boselli
| rowspan="1" style="vertical-align:top;" |15,556
| rowspan="1" style="vertical-align:top;" |0.6
| rowspan="1" style="vertical-align:top;" |-

| style="text-align:left;" |Socialist Party
| style="vertical-align:top;" |15,556
| style="vertical-align:top;" |0.6
| style="vertical-align:top;" |-

|-
! rowspan="1" style="text-align:left;vertical-align:top;" |Flavia D'Angeli
| rowspan="1" style="vertical-align:top;" |14,121
| rowspan="1" style="vertical-align:top;" |0.6
| rowspan="1" style="vertical-align:top;" |-

| style="text-align:left;" |Critical Left
| style="vertical-align:top;" |14,121
| style="vertical-align:top;" |0.6
| style="vertical-align:top;" |-

|-
! rowspan="1" style="text-align:left;vertical-align:top;" |Others
| rowspan="1" style="vertical-align:top;" |28,693
| rowspan="1" style="vertical-align:top;" |1.1
| rowspan="1" style="vertical-align:top;" |-

| style="text-align:left;" |others
| style="vertical-align:top;" |28,693
| style="vertical-align:top;" |1.1
| style="vertical-align:top;" |-

|-
|- style="background-color:#E9E9E9"
! rowspan="1" style="text-align:left;vertical-align:top;" |Total coalitions
! rowspan="1" style="text-align:right;vertical-align:top;" |2,534,294
! rowspan="1" style="text-align:right;vertical-align:top;" |100.0
! rowspan="1" style="text-align:right;vertical-align:top;" |22
! rowspan="1" style="text-align:left;vertical-align:top;" |Total parties
! rowspan="1" style="text-align:right;vertical-align:top;" |2,534,294
! rowspan="1" style="text-align:right;vertical-align:top;" |100.0
! rowspan="1" style="text-align:right;vertical-align:top;" |22
Source: Ministry of the Interior

MPs elected in Piedmont

Chamber of Deputies

Piedmont 1 (Torino)

The People of Freedom
Guido Crosetto
Margherita Boniver
Maurizio Leo
Osvaldo Napoli
Maria Grazia Siliquini
Benedetto Della Vedova
Manuela Repetti
Agostino Ghiglia
Enrico Pianetta

Democratic Party
Piero Fassino
Antonio Boccuzzi
Anna Rossomando
Giorgio Merlo
Marco Calgaro
Gianni Vernetti
Stefano Esposito
Giacomo Portas
Mimmo Lucà

Lega Nord
Stefano Allasia
Renato Togni
Elena Maccanti

Italy of Values
Giuseppe Giulietti
Gaetano Porcino

Union of the Centre
Michele Vietti

Piedmont 2 (Alessandria-Asti-Cuneo-Novara-Vercelli-Biella-Verbania)

The People of Freedom
Lucio Stanca
Marco Zacchera
Maria Teresa Armosino
Enrico Costa
Alessandro Ruben
Giuseppe Vegas
Roberto Rosso
Franco Stradella
Gianni Mancuso
Gaetano Nastri

Democratic Party
Luigi Bobba
Cesare Damiano
Mario Lovelli
Mario Barbi
massimo Fiorio
Elisabetta Rampi

Lega Nord
Roberto Cota
Gianluca Buonanno
Roberto Simonetti
Maria Piera Pastore
Sebastiano Fogliato

Italy of Values
Renato Cambursano

Union of the Centre
Teresio Delfino

Senate

The People of Freedom

Enzo Ghigo
Ugo Martinat
Aldo Scarabosio
Lucio Malan
Andrea Fluttero
Valter Zanetta
Lorenzo Piccioni
Giuseppe Menardi
Maria Rizzotti
Gilberto Pichetto Fratin

Democratic Party

Emma Bonino
Roberto Della Seta
Mauro Marino
Pietro Marcenaro
Maria Leddi
Franca Biondelli

Lega Nord

Michelino Davico
Enrico Montani
Lidia Boldi

Italy of Values

Patrizia Bugnano

Elections in Piedmont
2008 elections in Italy